Pat Bouchard (born 24 April 1973) is a Canadian speed skater. He competed at the 1994 Winter Olympics, the 1998 Winter Olympics and the 2002 Winter Olympics.

References

External links
 

1973 births
Living people
Canadian male speed skaters
Olympic speed skaters of Canada
Speed skaters at the 1994 Winter Olympics
Speed skaters at the 1998 Winter Olympics
Speed skaters at the 2002 Winter Olympics
Speed skaters from Quebec City
20th-century Canadian people
21st-century Canadian people